Joshua Alekisio Mafi born 7 November 1996 in Brisbane, Australia, is an Australian rugby union player who plays at Hooker for Queensland Reds in Super Rugby.

Career
After three years of First XV experience at St. Joseph's Nudgee College from 2012 to 2014, Bond University Awarded him the John Eales Rugby Scholarship to help keep him in Gold Coast rugby.

During the 2015 Season playing for Bond University he signed for Queensland Country for the 2015 National Rugby Championship

Mafi earned himself a contract with the Queensland Reds for 3 years starting in 2016.

Super Rugby statistics

References

Australian rugby union players
1996 births
Living people
Rugby union hookers
Queensland Country (NRC team) players
Rugby union players from Brisbane
Queensland Reds players
Urayasu D-Rocks players
Melbourne Rebels players